Hulda of Holland is a 1913 American short drama film. Harold Lloyd features in an uncredited role.

Cast
 Ben F. Wilson as Heintz
 Laura Sawyer as Hulda
 Jessie McAllister
 Charles Sutton
 Harold Lloyd as Bit Role (uncredited)

See also
 Harold Lloyd filmography

References

External links
 

1913 films
1913 short films
1913 drama films
American silent short films
American black-and-white films
Silent American drama films
Films directed by J. Searle Dawley
1910s American films